Hydrogen bromide is the inorganic compound with the formula . It is a hydrogen halide consisting of hydrogen and bromine.  A colorless gas, it dissolves in water, forming hydrobromic acid, which is saturated at 68.85% HBr by weight at room temperature. Aqueous solutions that are 47.6% HBr by mass form a constant-boiling azeotrope mixture that boils at 124.3 °C. Boiling less concentrated solutions releases H2O until the constant-boiling mixture composition is reached.

Hydrogen bromide, and its aqueous solution, are commonly used reagents in the preparation of bromide compounds.

Reactions

Organic chemistry
Hydrogen bromide and hydrobromic acid are important reagents in the production of organobromine compounds.  In a free-radical reaction, HBr adds to alkenes:
 
The resulting alkyl bromides are useful alkylating agents, e.g., as precursors to fatty amine derivatives.  Related free radical additions to allyl chloride and styrene give 1-bromo-3-chloropropane and phenylethylbromide, respectively.

Hydrogen bromide reacts with dichloromethane to give bromochloromethane and dibromomethane, sequentially:
 
 
These metathesis reactions illustrate the consumption of the stronger acid (HBr) and release of the weaker acid (HCl).

Allyl bromide is prepared by treating allyl alcohol with HBr:
 

HBr adds to alkynes to yield bromoalkenes.  The stereochemistry of this type of addition is usually anti:
 RC≡CH + HBr → RC(Br)=CH2

Also, HBr adds epoxides and lactones, resulting in ring-opening.

With triphenylphosphine, HBr gives triphenylphosphonium bromide, a solid "source" of HBr.

Inorganic chemistry
Vanadium(III) bromide and molybdenum(IV) bromide were prepared by treatment of the higher chlorides with HBr. These reactions proceed via redox reactions:

Industrial preparation
Hydrogen bromide (along with hydrobromic acid) is produced by combining hydrogen and bromine at temperatures between 200 and 400 °C.  The reaction is typically catalyzed by platinum or asbestos.

Laboratory synthesis
HBr can be prepared by distillation of a solution of sodium bromide or potassium bromide with phosphoric acid or sulfuric acid:
 KBr + H2SO4 → KHSO4 + HBr

Concentrated sulfuric acid is less effective because it oxidizes HBr to bromine:
 2 HBr + H2SO4 → Br2 + SO2 + 2 H2O

The acid may be prepared by:
 reaction of bromine with water and sulfur:
 2 Br2 + S + 2 H2O → 4 HBr + SO2
 bromination of tetralin:
 C10H12 + 4 Br2 → C10H8Br4 + 4 HBr
 reduction of bromine with phosphorous acid:
 Br2 + H3PO3 + H2O → H3PO4 + 2 HBr
Anhydrous hydrogen bromide can also be produced on a small scale by thermolysis of triphenylphosphonium bromide in refluxing xylene.

Hydrogen bromide prepared by the above methods can be contaminated with Br2, which can be removed by passing the gas through a solution of phenol at room temperature in tetrachloromethane or other suitable solvent (producing 2,4,6-tribromophenol and generating more HBr in the process) or through copper turnings or copper gauze at high temperature.

Safety
HBr is highly corrosive and irritating to inhalation.

References

Inorganic compounds
Hydrogen compounds
Bromides
Nonmetal halides
Diatomic molecules